Sarah Antoinette LeFanu (born 6 August 1953) is a Scottish author and academic.

Biography
Sarah Antoinette LeFanu was born in Aberdeen, Scotland. She worked as an editor for the Women's Press, and taught classes on feminism and science fiction at the City Lit Centre in London. She edited the 1985 volume Despatches from the Frontiers of the Female Mind, and in 1988 she published In the Chinks of the World Machine: Feminism and Science Fiction, an analysis of contemporary science fiction writers, particularly women. Prominent among these were Suzy McKee Charnas, Ursula K. Le Guin, Joanna Russ, and James Tiptree Jr. Reviewing the volume for Science Fiction Studies, Veronica Hollinger wrote that it was "detailed and wide-ranging, frequently incisive, and always entertaining." In her writing LeFanu argued that science fiction had provided a means for women writers to overcome the patriarchal conventions of conventional fiction, and thereby to speak in their own voices. She also wrote a biography of Rose Macaulay, published in 2003. In 2020 she published Something of Themselves, a biographical volume about Arthur Conan Doyle, Mary Kingsley, and Rudyard Kipling in South Africa in 1900 during the Boer War. The book was described as a "splendidly well-written page-turner" by The Times Literary Supplement.

References

Scottish women academics
Scottish women writers
Science fiction academics
Scottish biographers
1953 births
Living people